Justin James Adam (born August 22, 1974) is a photographer, musician and former Canadian professional baseball player in the Kansas City Royals organization.

Career

Baseball
Adam was drafted in the 7th round of the 1992 Major League Baseball draft by the Kansas City Royals. From 1992 to 1994 Adam played with the Gulf Coast League Royals. In 1995 Adam played for the Spokane Indians. In 1996 Adam played his final year of professional baseball with the Lansing Lugnuts.

The arts
After playing five years in professional baseball Adam shifted careers to the arts. In the early 1990s Adam began making music under the name of Moon McMullen. In the 1990s Adam studied film at University of Windsor and the Vancouver Film School. 

In 2001 Adam began work on his first film The Man with a DV Cam along with Mike Hawley. The film was entered into the 2002 Slamdance Film Festival. Adam and Hawley were the only Canadians in the short-film competition as well as one of the only Canadian films at the festival with the other being Lee Demarbre's Jesus Christ Vampire Hunter. In the late 2000s Adam also began taking photographs for magazines, journals and models including Kate Bock. In 2014 Adam founded Miniature Massive with the aim to "create solutions and designs to make a more positive impact."

Notes

1974 births
Gulf Coast Royals players
Lansing Lugnuts players
Spokane Indians players
Living people